East Highland Lutheran Church is a historic church in rural Deuel County, South Dakota. The church is located approximately 6 miles northeast of the community of Brandt. The church was built in Late Gothic Revival style in 1915. It was added to the National Register in 2000. The church is affiliated with the Evangelical Lutheran Church in America.

References

Lutheran churches in South Dakota
Churches on the National Register of Historic Places in South Dakota
Gothic Revival church buildings in South Dakota
Churches completed in 1915
Buildings and structures in Deuel County, South Dakota
National Register of Historic Places in Deuel County, South Dakota